Roman Andriyovych Dytko (born 21 August 1996) is a Ukrainian professional footballer who plays as an attacking midfielder for Ukrainian club Prykarpattia Ivano-Frankivsk.

References

External links
 Profile on Prykarpattia Ivano-Frankivsk official website
 
 

1996 births
Living people
Ukrainian footballers
Association football midfielders
FC Prykarpattia Ivano-Frankivsk (1998) players
Ukrainian First League players
Ukrainian Second League players
Sportspeople from Ivano-Frankivsk Oblast